The Palm phone, or "Palm companion device", "Palm Palm", "TCL Palm", codenamed "Pepito" with model number PVG100 is a smartphone running the Android operating system, announced on October 15, 2018, and is first available in the United States from November 2, that year. 

Palm is developed, designed, and marketed by Palm Ventures Group, a San Francisco-based start up founded by Dennis Miloseski and Howard Nuk. Palm Ventures is financially backed by Chinese electronics company TCL that owns the Palm trademark, originally of Palm, Inc. The phone is manufactured by China's Tinno Mobile as an ODM for TCL.

With a 3.3-inch screen and 62.5g weight that is noticeably smaller and lighter than other smartphones released at the same time, the Palm was initially marketed as "an ultra-mobile companion" device that is meant to be used in conjunction with a regular smartphone—positioning it as a cross-over between a wearable and a smartphone, and originally could only be used by pairing the device with another phone on the Verizon network. However, the restriction was subsequently lifted for new buyers as well as oversea markets, which make it also possible to use the device as a standalone phone.

It is the first "Palm"-branded device on the market since 2010 (Palm Pre 2).

Specifications

Software

Hardware

Availability 
The Palm was initially launched on November 2, 2018, exclusively on Verizon in the US as a companion device in a bundle with a phone. Since December 2018 it has been available on Vodafone in the UK, Spain and Germany. Vodafone has secured a 6 months exclusivity deal for Europe. Since January 20, 2019, the device has been available in Hong Kong. It was released for sale as standalone device in the US in April 2019.

References 

Smart devices
Android (operating system) devices
Mobile phones introduced in 2018